Lake Leelanau lies in the Leelanau Peninsula of the U.S. state of Michigan. The lake is also sometimes known as Carp Lake.

Location
Lake Leelanau connects on the northwest to the Leland River, which runs for one mile (1.6 km) to Lake Michigan.  Between North Lake Leelanau and South Lake Leelanau the water narrows for about a mile near the unincorporated community of Lake Leelanau. 
 
A bridge crosses the narrows on M-204.  Just south of the bridge is Fountain Point, a historic and scenic landmark as well as a popular summer resort.

On the southern end, South Lake Leelanau ends in a marshy area fed by several small creeks, and the waters access the community of Cedar in Solon Township.

History
Indigenous people  who first inhabited the area called this land "ke-ski-bi-ag," which means "narrow body of water,".

Henry Rowe Schoolcraft, an Indigenous agent for the territory, was credited with formally naming the county, and was said to use Leelinau as a character in his writing. See Leelanau County for a more complete discussion of the etymology of the name.

Scholars have established, however, that Leelinau was first used as a pen name by Schoolcraft's wife Jane Johnston Schoolcraft in writings for The Literary Voyager, a family magazine which she and her husband wrote together in the 1820s.  Jane Johnston was of Ojibwa and Scots-Irish descent, and wrote in Ojibwe and English.  While her writing was not published formally in her lifetime (except as Schoolcraft appropriated it under his own name), Jane Johnston Schoolcraft has been recognized as "the first Native American literary writer, the first known Indian woman writer, the first known Indian poet, the first known poet to write poems in a Native American language, and the first known American Indian to write out traditional Indian stories."  In 2008 Jane Johnston Schoolcraft was inducted into the Michigan Women's Hall of Fame.

See also
List of lakes in Michigan

References

External links
 Fountain Point Resort website
 Lake Leelanau Lake Association

Lakes of Leelanau County, Michigan
Lakes of Michigan